Hydroxysteroid 17-beta dehydrogenase 6 is an enzyme that in humans is encoded by the HSD17B6 gene.

The protein encoded by this gene has both oxidoreductase and epimerase activities and is involved in androgen catabolism. The oxidoreductase activity can convert 3 alpha-adiol to dihydrotestosterone, while the epimerase activity can convert androsterone to epi-androsterone. Both reactions use NAD+ as the preferred cofactor. This gene is a member of the retinol dehydrogenase family. Transcript variants utilizing alternative polyadenylation signals exist.

References

Further reading